Czerniaków is a neighbourhood of the city of Warsaw, located within the borough of Mokotów, between the escarpment of the Vistula river and the river itself.

Called Czerniakowo since the Middle Ages, it was then merely a small village located well to the south of the Warsaw's Old Town. In the 19th century the area became densely built-up and became populated mostly by factory workers and other lower classes of society, which gave birth to a specific local version of the Warsaw dialect. During the Warsaw Uprising the area was one of the last Polish strongholds.

Neighbourhoods of Mokotów